Phostria bistigmalis is a moth in the family Crambidae. It was described by Embrik Strand in 1913. It is found in Tanzania and Zimbabwe.

References

Maes, 2014. Notes on the Crambidae of Africa with new synonyms and combinations (Lepidoptera Pyraloidea Crambidae). Lambillionea CXIV, 2, 2014: 139-143

Moths described in 1913
Phostria
Moths of Africa